The Cemetery of Notre-Dame, Versailles, is a cemetery in  Versailles, Yvelines, France, near the Palace of Versailles. It was established by the church and parish of Notre-Dame in 1777, and covers three hectares. The postal address is 15 Rue des Missionnaires.

Besides quantities of burials of aristocrats, members of religious orders and people of artistic or historic interest, there is also an enclosed section for soldiers of the Prussian army who fell during the Franco-Prussian War of 1870–71.

Notable burials 

 :fr:Félix Antoine Appert (1817–1891), general
 :fr:Jean-François Chiappe (1931–2001), historian
 Jeanne Potot de Commarmond (1779–1866), second wife of André-Marie Ampère
 Émile Deschamps (1791–1871), poet (his tomb is anonymous, with only the inscription: Ci-gît un poète - "Here lies a poet")
 Louis-Édouard Dubufe (1819–1883), painter, brother-in-law of Gounod
 Jules Favre (1809–1880), lawyer, Minister of Foreign Affairs under the Third Republic
 André François-Poncet (1887–1978), ambassador, Academician
 Baron Étienne Hastrel de Rivedoux (1766–1846), general of the Empire, governor of  Hamburg
 :fr:Gustave Heuzé (1816–1907), agronomist
 Marcelle Lanchon (1891–1933), a religious who received visions of the Blessed Virgin Mary
 Jeanne-Marie (1875–1947) and Frédéric Petitjean de La Rosière (1876–1949), authors of sentimental popular novels  under the joint pen name of Delly
 :fr:Frédéric Nepveu (1777–1862), one of the architects of the Palace of Versailles
 Michel Peter (1824–1893), member of the Académie de Médecine
 Andrés de Santa Cruz (1792–1865), president of Peru and of Bolivia (his ashes were repatriated to Bolivia in 1965).

See also 
 Cimetière des Gonards
 Cemetery of Saint-Louis, Versailles

References

External links
 

Versailles, Cemetery of Notre-Dame
Versailles
1777 establishments in France